Antony Hamilton Lamb  (born 7 March 1939) is a former Australian politician. He served in the House of Representatives from 1972 to 1975 and from 1984 to 1990, representing the Australian Labor Party (ALP). He was a pharmacist prior to entering politics.

Early life
Lamb was born on 7 March 1939 in Horsham, Victoria. He was one of three children born to Marie Christine and George Hamilton Lamb, his father being a Country Party member of the parliament of Victoria. His mother died in 1941 following a long illness, while his father died in 1943 as a Japanese prisoner of war on the Burma Railway.

Lamb attended Box Hill High School before taking up a scholarship at Scotch College, Melbourne. He qualified as a pharmacist at the Victorian College of Pharmacy in 1959, where he was a member of the Young Labor Association and active in the New Theatre. He later completed the degree of Bachelor of Arts at the University of Melbourne in 1971 and a diploma in education at Monash University in 1979.

Lamb completed an apprenticeship with Eric Scott, the president of The Pharmacy Guild of Australia. He later worked for periods in South Croydon and Camberwell before becoming manager of a pharmacy at the Northland Shopping Centre in Preston.

Politics
In 1972, he was elected to the Australian House of Representatives as the Labor member for La Trobe. As a backbench member in 1973, Lamb and David McKenzie introduced the Medical Practice Clarification Bill which, if passed, would have allowed abortion in the Australian Capital Territory. The bill was defeated after a conscience vote on 10 May 1973 by 98 votes to 23.

Lamb held the seat of LaTrobe until his defeat in 1975. In 1984 he returned to the House as the member for the new seat of Streeton, which he held until its abolition in 1990. Lamb then contested the seat of Deakin, but was unsuccessful.

Later life
In the Australia Day Honors, 2006, Lamb received the Medal of the Order of Australia (OAM) for service to pharmacy, to the Australian Parliament and to the community.

In 2009, Lamb published his thesis in fulfilment of the requirements of the degree of Doctor of Philosophy:  

In 2015, Lamb and three other former MPs brought a case before the High Court of Australia, purporting that reductions to their retirement allowances and limitations on the number of "domestic return trips per year" under the Members of Parliament (Life Gold Pass) Act 2002 was unconstitutional under S51(xxxi) of the Constitution of Australia. They lost the case in 2016, with the court finding that Parliament was entitled to vary the terms of allowances.

References

|-

1939 births
Living people
Australian Labor Party members of the Parliament of Australia
Members of the Australian House of Representatives for La Trobe
Members of the Australian House of Representatives for Streeton
Members of the Australian House of Representatives
Recipients of the Medal of the Order of Australia
Australian pharmacists
University of Melbourne alumni
20th-century Australian politicians